The Whigham GW-1 is an American high-wing, single-seat glider that was designed and constructed by Gene Whigham, a retired flight test engineer for Convair.

Design and development
The GW-1 was built in concert with the Tweed GT-1 as both builders shared ideas and tools. The two aircraft share some common design features, although their wings are completely different. The GW-1 first flew in 1959 and at that time had a  wingspan.

The constant-chord wing features a NACA 23018 airfoil and flaps of 25% chord and  span. The aircraft's construction is all-metal, except for the fiberglass nose.

Only one GW-1 was built and it was registered in the Experimental Amateur-built category.

Operational history
The GW-1 was used to complete a diamond badge goal flight in 1961.

In July 2011, some 52 years after its completion, the aircraft was still on the Federal Aviation Administration registry and owned by John Coughlin of Del Rio, Texas.

Specifications (GW-1)

See also

References

1950s United States sailplanes
Homebuilt aircraft
Aircraft first flown in 1959
High-wing aircraft